VO5 may refer to:

 VO5 (band), an American disco band
 Alberto VO5, a brand from Alberto-Culver